The first Freedom from Hunger Day was held on September 28, 2006 to increase awareness about global hunger and promote Freedom from Hunger's empowerment of women around the world. The event included walk-through exhibits of regions where Freedom from Hunger operates - India, Latin America, West Africa, and the Philippines - where visitors enjoyed native food and entertainment. In addition, Freedom from Hunger provided children with passports that included historical and cultural information from each region that were stamped at each exhibit.

As a result of the event's success, Yolo County confirmed September 28 as "Freedom From Hunger Day", the State of California declared the date as an official day of awareness and, in the Sacramento area, the event won a gold public relations award.

Freedom from Hunger Day 2007
2007's Freedom from Hunger Day also included an extensive online component. On September 28, Freedom from Hunger's home page was devoted to this day of awareness. The website included video clips taken by the staff, sound bites of women sharing dreams for themselves and their families, a live video conference with Freedom from Hunger's President Chris Dunford, and timed release of podcasts throughout the day. In honor of Freedom from Hunger Day, the website offered visitors the opportunity to send a free e-card to raise awareness about ending hunger. 

In addition, Freedom from Hunger invited the public to host parties in their homes by providing a party pack that includes an original board game, DVD, fliers, buttons, literature, and a CD of international music.

Freedom from Hunger Day 2008
The 2008 online observance of Freedom from Hunger Day was held from September 25 to 28, 2008.  Freedom from Hunger's homepage was replaced by a page devoted to Freedom from Hunger Day.  The new landing page will feature actions that website visitors can take in the face of the Global Food Crisis.  Freedom from Hunger Day was a featured action on the Care2 network.

Freedom from Hunger Day 2009
2009's Freedom from Hunger day included extensive online content.

Freedom from Hunger Day 2010
This year's Freedom from Hunger day is also going to be observed online. We will take over the home page and post videos of Freedom from Hunger in action where our volunteers and overseas staff will share their experiences. You will also hear directly from the women that we reach - as they share their hopes and dreams for their families and how Freedom from Hunger is working with them to make those goals a reality.

References

September observances
Fundraising events
Organizations based in California